Major-General Theodore Edward Stephenson CB (1856–1928) was a British Army officer who commanded 2nd Division.

Military career
Educated at Marlborough College, Stephenson was commissioned into the 56th Regiment of Foot in 1874. He served in the Second Boer War in which he commanded a column which took part in the attack on Plessis Poort. In his final despatch from South Africa in June 1902, Lord Kitchener, Commander-in-Chief of the forces during the latter part of the war, described Stephenson as "an excellent Officer, who has displayed good sense wherever he has been employed". Following the end of the war in June 1902, he stayed on in South Africa for several months with a staff appointment and the local rank of major-general.

He also served in the Zulu Rebellion of 1905 and became General Officer Commanding 6th Division in 1906, General Officer Commanding 2nd Division in 1907 and Commander of the Troops in the Straits Settlements in 1910. He served in the First World War as General Officer Commanding 65th (2nd Lowland) Division before retiring in 1918.

Family
He married Philippa Watson.

References

|-

|-

|-

1856 births
1928 deaths
British Army major generals
British Army generals of World War I
Companions of the Order of the Bath
56th Regiment of Foot officers
People educated at Marlborough College
Military personnel from Dorset